Modunda is a genus of jumping spiders that was first described by Eugène Louis Simon in 1901.  it contains only three species, found only in Asia and South Africa: M. aeneiceps, M. orientalis, and M. staintoni.

References

External links
 Photograph of M. staintoni

Salticidae genera
Salticidae
Spiders of Africa
Spiders of Asia